Helen Wood (born 1986) is an English former television personality, author, columnist, podcaster and former escort. She is known as the winner of Big Brother 15 and for her regular column in the Daily Star newspaper until March 2017.

Early life
Wood was brought up within the Metropolitan Borough of Bolton and has two brothers. After what Wood claims was a troublesome upbringing in her memoir,  she was placed into Foster care aged 14 after leaving home. Whilst at school Helen then became pregnant with her only child, born in 2003. She attended Thornleigh Salesian College.

Career

2006: Escorting 
In 2006, Wood was a single mother and in debt and was recruited into escort work by her former friend Jenny Thompson.

2010: Wayne Rooney threesome
Jennifer Thompson sold a story to the News of the World claiming she and Wood were each paid £1,000 for a threesome with Wayne Rooney in a Manchester hotel in July 2008 while his wife, Coleen Rooney, was five months pregnant. It was reported his solicitors unsuccessfully tried to fight the allegations when they first surfaced in early August 2010.  Wood allegedly attempted to gain support from Wayne Rooney's agent to suppress the story. Wood eventually sold her version of events for £40,000.

2011: Gagging order
In 2011, an actor took out a court injunction to prevent her revealing their relationship. The actor paid Wood after booking her via an escort agency in March 2008. Despite the injunction, the actor's name was revealed in the Irish and US press. Former publicist Max Clifford represented Wood at the time. Shortly after the injunction was carried out, both Wood & Clifford appeared to be no longer associated.

2014: Big Brother 
In 2014, Wood controversially won Big Brother 15, where the winner's prize was £100,000. She was the first woman to win the competition since the show's inception on Channel 5. 
 
Ofcom received over 1,500 complaints for Wood and Pauline Bennett bullying Jale Karaturp. Wood received a warning on Day 12 due to bullying Jale Karaturp and on Day 21, she received another warning due to using threatening behaviour to fellow housemate Matthew Davies.

Wood continued her feud with fellow housemate Danielle McMahon after the series had finished. Wood was arrested in March 2015 following an altercation with McMahon.
 
She returned in Big Brother 16 for two weeks as a "Time Warp Housemate". Wood clashed with another Time Warp Housemate, Brian Belo, branding him "psycho", comparing him to a murderer and telling him he "looked like a rapist". Belo climbed over the big brother wall house, Wood received a final formal warning. Channel 5 boss Ben Frow banned her from appearing on the series or its sister show, Bit on the Side, ever again. He stated that it was a "mistake in allowing her to be a housemate for the second time". Wood went on to explain her reasons in her memoir to what allegedly happened behind the scenes between her & Belo.

2017–present: Other projects 
After her appearance on Big Brother, Wood wrote a column for British tabloid newspaper the Daily Star.

Her debut memoir, A Man’s World, was released on 3 June 2019.

References

1986 births
Living people
Participants in British reality television series
British journalists
English female prostitutes
People from Bolton
Big Brother (British TV series) winners